Cadieu is a French surname. Notable people with the surname include:

Bert Cadieu (1903–1990), Canadian politician
Jean-Marie Cadieu (born 1963), French rugby union player
Trevor Cadieu, Canadian military officer

See also
Cadieux

French-language surnames